Merry Christmas Lil' Mama is a collaborative Christmas mixtape by singer Jeremih and rapper Chance the Rapper. It is the fourth mixtape by Jeremih, and the fifth mixtape by Chance the Rapper. The mixtape was self-released via SoundCloud on December 22, 2016, and features collaborations with Noname, King Louie, and comedian Hannibal Buress, amongst others. The mixtape is dedicated to the city of Chicago.

The mixtape was reissued on December 19, 2017, as a double-disc mixtape titled Merry Christmas Lil' Mama Re-Wrapped. The mixtape contained nine new songs and a piano remix of "Stranger At The Table". Disc Two featured a returned guest appearance from Hannibal Buress and Chicagoan rapper Valee. A second reissue occurred in 2020, titled Merry Christmas Lil' Mama: The Gift that Keeps on Giving, featuring the previously unreleased songs "The Return", “Who’s to Say”, and “Let Me Bang”.

Critical reception 

Craig Jenkins from Vulture called "All the Way" and "Snowed In" the mixtape's best tracks, despite calling the project "less like Christmas music and more like a fun, low-stakes love letter to both artists' place of birth". Pitchfork published a review of the mixtape's reissue in 2017, awarding it 7.7 out of 10.

Track listing
Songwriting credits adapted from American Society of Composers, Authors and Publishers (ASCAP).

Notes 
 "All the Way" features vocals by Hannibal Buress and King Louie
 "Snowed In", "Joy", & "I'm Your Santa" features vocals from Teddy Jackson
 "I Shoulda Left You" features vocals by Lud Foe
 "The Tragedy" features vocals by Noname
 "Merry Christmas Lil Mama" features vocals by King Louie
 "Lil Bit (Interlude)" features vocals by Hannibal Buress
 "Are U Live" features vocals by Valee

Personnel
 Common – drums
 Lena Waithe – drums

References

2016 mixtape albums
2016 Christmas albums
Jeremih albums
Chance the Rapper albums
Christian hip hop albums
Contemporary R&B Christmas albums
Christmas albums by American artists
Self-released albums
Collaborative albums
Albums produced by C-Sick
Albums produced by Hit-Boy
Albums produced by Zaytoven
Contemporary R&B albums by American artists
Hip hop albums by American artists